Henry Schenck Harris (December 27, 1850, Belvidere, New Jersey – May 2, 1902, Belvidere, New Jersey), was an American lawyer and Democratic Party politician who represented New Jersey's 4th congressional district for one term in the United States House of Representatives from 1881 to 1883.

Early life and education
Harris was born in Belvidere, New Jersey on December 27, 1850. He attended the common schools and was graduated from Princeton College in 1870. He studied law, was admitted to the bar in 1873 and commenced practice in Belvidere. He was appointed prosecutor of the pleas for Warren County in March 1877.

Congress
Harris was elected as a Democrat to the Forty-seventh Congress, serving in office from March 4, 1881 – March 3, 1883, but was an unsuccessful candidate for reelection in 1882 to the Forty-eighth Congress.

After Congress
After leaving Congress, he resumed the practice of law. He died in Belvidere on May 2, 1902, and was interred in Belvidere Cemetery.

References

External links

Henry Schenck Harris at The Political Graveyard

1850 births
1902 deaths
New Jersey lawyers
People from Belvidere, New Jersey
Democratic Party members of the United States House of Representatives from New Jersey
Princeton University alumni
Burials in New Jersey
19th-century American politicians